Antun Yusuf Hanna Diyab (born circa 1688) was a Syrian Maronite writer and storyteller. He originated the best-known versions of the tales of Aladdin and Ali Baba and the Forty Thieves which have been added to the One Thousand and One Nights since French orientalist Antoine Galland translated and included them, after which they soon became popular across the West.

He was long known only from brief mentions in the diary of Antoine Galland, but the translation and publication of his manuscript autobiography in 2015 dramatically expanded knowledge about his life. Recent reassessments of Diyab's contribution to Les mille et une nuits, Galland's hugely influential version of the Arabic One Thousand and One Nights, have argued that his artistry is central to the literary history of such famous tales as Aladdin and Ali Baba and the Forty Thieves, despite Diyab never being named in Galland's publications.

Ruth B. Bottigheimer and Paulo Lemos Horta have argued that Diyab should be understood as the original author of some of the stories he supplied, and even that several of Diyab's stories (including Aladdin) were partly inspired by Diyab's own life, as there are parallels with his autobiography.

Life

Sources
Most of what is known about Diyab's life comes from his autobiography, which he composed in 1763, at an age of around 75. It survives as Vatican Library MS Sbath 254 (though the first few pages are missing) and its lively narrative has been described as picaresque, and a valuable example of the colloquial, eighteenth-century Middle Arabic of Aleppo, influenced by Aramaic and Turkish. Focusing on his travels from 1707-1710, it provides an outsider's view of Paris in 1708-1709 as well as extensive glimpses into other aspects of Diyab's world, though it may not only reflect Diyab's eye-witness experiences, but also his literary knowledge of the places and cultures he encountered, and his identity as a raconteur.

Other details of Diyab's life are known from the diaries of Antoine Galland, Diyab's marriage contract of 1717, and an Aleppo census of 1740.

Early life in Syria and journey to France
Diyab was born to a Maronite Christian family in Aleppo, Ottoman Syria, around 1688 and lost his father while still in his teens. Working as a young man for French merchants in Syria, Diyab learned French and Italian; according to Galland, he also had a knowledge of Provençal and Turkish; it is also possible that, as a Maronite, he knew some Syriac.

Diyab briefly joined a Maronite monastery on Mount Lebanon as a novice, but left. As he proceeded home, around the beginning of 1707, he met the Frenchman Paul Lucas, who was on an expedition in search of antiquities on behalf of Louis XIV of France. Lucas invited Diyab to return with him to France, working as a servant, assistant and interpreter, suggesting that he might find work at the Royal Library in Paris.

Leaving Aleppo in February 1707, they visited Tripoli, Sidon, Beirut, Cyprus, then to Egypt, from where they traveled to Libya, then Tunisia. From there he went to Corsica, Livorno, Genoa and Marseille, before reaching Paris early in 1708, where his stay culminated with his reception at Versailles in the apartments of Louis XIV. Diyab was received with some excitement in Paris, partly because Lucas had him wear national dress and carry a cage containing two jerboas from Tunisia. He met the King at Versailles. However, he tired of seeking preferment and returned to Aleppo in 1710.

Telling stories to Galland

While in Paris, Diyab first met the Orientalist Antoine Galland on Sunday, March 17, 1709. Galland's diary contains extended summaries of stories told by Diyab on March 25. Galland recorded more stories, apparently from oral telling, throughout May and into June that year. He went on to include these works as a continuation of his French translation of an incomplete Arabic manuscript of the Thousand and One Nights, and they include some of the stories that became the most popular and closely associated with the Thousand and One Nights in later world literature. It seems likely that Diyab told these stories in French.
Diyab's autobiography represents Lucas as having miraculous medical capabilities, but Diyab enjoyed less acknowledgement from his French associates: he received no credit in Galland's published work, nor any mention in the writing of Lucas. According to the autobiography, Galland was afraid that Diyab would gain a position at the Royal Library that he desired for himself and Galland conspired to send Diyab back to Aleppo.

Later life

After his return to Aleppo in 1710, Diyāb became a successful cloth merchant with the help of his brother Abdallah. He married in 1717 and had extensive progeny. By 1740, he lived in one of the community's largest households, alongside his mother and two elder brothers.

As well as writing his autobiography in 1763, Diyab seems to have copied (or at least owned) another manuscript, Vatican Library, Sbath 108, containing Arabic translations of the Sefaretname travelogue by Ilyas ibn Hanna al-Mawsili concerning his own travels, Ilyas's history of the Spanish conquest of the Americas, and an account by the Ottoman ambassador Yirmisekizzade Mehmed Said Pasha of his 1719 embassy to France.

Stories told by Diyab 

Though usually corresponding to widespread international tale-types and both presented by Galland and often still imagined today as traditional Arabic folk-tales, it is likely that Diyab's repertoire and narrative style reflects his education and literary reading, multilingualism, and extensive travels within and beyond the Arab world.

Works

 Dyâb, Hanna, D’Alep à Paris: Les pérégrinations d’un jeune syrien au temps de Louis XIV, ed. and trans. by Paule Fahmé-Thiéry, Bernard Heyberger, and Jérôme Lentin (Paris: Sindbad, 2015) [autobiography in French translation].
 Dyâb, Hanna, Min Halab ila Baris: Rihla ila Bilat Luwis Arrabi' 'Ashir, ed. by Mamede Jarouche and Safa A.-C. Jubran (Beirut/Baghdad: Al-Jamal, 2017) [critical edition in Arabic]
 Diyāb, Ḥannā, The Book of Travels, ed. by Johannes Stephan, trans. by Elias Muhanna, 2 vols (New York: New York University Press, 2021), 
 Ulrich Marzolph and Anne E. Duggan, 'Ḥannā Diyāb's Tales', Marvels & Tales 32.1 (2018), 133–154 (part I); 32.2 (2018) 435–456 (part II) [English translations of Galland's summaries of Diyab's tales].
 'Hanna Diyab Tales, as Transcribed by Galland in his Diary', trans. by Ulrich Marzolph and Anne E. Duggan, ed. by Paulo Lemos Horta, in The Annotated Arabian Nights: Tales from 1001 Nights, trans. by Yasmine Seale, ed. by Paulo Lemos Horta (New York: Liveright, 2021), pp. 523–96. .
 Catalogue record and digitisation of Vatican Library, Sbath.108 [a manuscript of which Diyāb seems to have been the scribe].
 Catalogue record and digitisation of Vatican Library, Sbath.254 [Diyāb's manuscript autobiography in digital facsimile].

Further reading 

 
 
 
 
 
 B. Bottigheimer, Ruth (2021). “Hannā Diyāb’s ‘A Sultan of Samarcand’, an Eleventh-Century Old Georgian St. George Legend, and the Construction of an Early Modern Fairy Tale”. In: Ethnographica Et Folkloristica Carpathica, no. 23 (October):7-22. https://doi.org/10.47516/ethnographica/23/2021/10059.
 
  
 
 Larzul, Sylvette. "Further Considerations on Galland's "Mille Et Une Nuits": A Study of the Tales Told by Hanna." In: Marvels & Tales 18, no. 2 (2004): pp. 258–71. www.jstor.org/stable/41388712.

References 

1680s births
Arabic–French translators
Roman Catholic writers
Translators of One Thousand and One Nights
17th-century male writers
18th-century male writers
Syrian Christians
Syrian writers
People from Aleppo
Maronites
18th-century storytellers